Isakovo may refer to:
Isakovo, Russia, name of several rural localities in Russia
Isakovo, Serbia, a village in the municipality of Ćuprija, Serbia